Novovasylivka is an urban-type settlement in Melitopol Raion of Zaporizhzhia Oblast in Ukraine. Novovasylivka hosts the administration of Novovasylivka settlement hromada, one of the hromadas of Ukraine. Population: 

Until 18 July 2020, Novovasylivka belonged to Pryazovske Raion. The raion was abolished in July 2020 as part of the administrative reform of Ukraine, which reduced the number of raions of Zaporizhzhia Oblast to five. The area of Pryazovske Raion was merged into Melitopol Raion.

Economy

Transportation
The settlement has access to highway M14 which runs parallel to the sea coast, connecting Melitopol and Mariupol.

References

Urban-type settlements in Melitopol Raion